Bobby Jaspar (20 February 1926 – 28 February 1963) was a Belgian cool jazz and hard bop saxophonist, flautist and composer.

Early life
Born in Liège, Belgium, Jaspar learned to play piano and clarinet at a young age. Later, he took up the tenor saxophone and flute.

Career
With the "Bop Shots" band, he took his first steps in the jazz world.  In 1950, Jaspar moved to Paris, playing and recording with the best musicians of the era.  Here he met singer Blossom Dearie; the two were married in 1954 but separated in 1957.

In 1956, Jaspar was persuaded to try his luck in the United States, where his reputation in jazz circles had preceded him. He played and recorded with the quintet of J. J. Johnson, with Kenny Burrell, Miles Davis, John Coltrane, Toshiko Akiyoshi, Donald Byrd and many others.

In 1961/1962, Jaspar returned to Europe for a year for a series of concerts and a number of recordings.  With his colleague, Belgian guitarist René Thomas, he formed a successful quintet. In some sessions, this was expanded to a powerful sextet with American trumpeter Chet Baker. One of those sessions, recorded in 1962, was released on record as Chet Is Back!.

Death
Bobby Jaspar died from a heart attack in New York City, on 28 February 1963 at age 37.

Discography

As leader/coleader 
 Flute Flight with Herbie Mann (Prestige, 1957)
 Flute Soufflé with Herbie Mann (Prestige, 1957)
 Bobby Jaspar with George Wallington with George Wallington (Riverside, 1957) – aka Tenor Sax and Flute
 Bobby Jaspar Quartet at Ronnie Scott's (Mole, 1962)
 In Paris (DRG, 1990)
 Phenil Isopropil Amine (Polygram, 1991)
 Bobby Jaspar & His Modern Jazz (Vogue, 1999)
 Bobby Jaspar & Henri Renaud (Vogue, 2000)
 Jazz in Paris Modern Jazz Au Club St Germain aka In Memory of Dick (Gitanes, 2001)
 Bobby Jaspar With Friends (Fresh Sound, 2004) (with Mundell Lowe & René Thomas)
 Clarinescapade (Fresh Sound, 2007)
 Jeux De Cartes (Universal, 2008)
 Complete Live at the Bohemia Recordings: J. J. Johnson Quintet feat. Bobby Jaspar (Fresh Sound, 2009)
 Revisited (Traditions Alive, 2010)
 Modern Jazz Au Club (Universal, 2010)

With Chet Baker
 Chet Baker And His Quintet With Bobby Jaspar [also known as Alone Together] (Barclay, 1956)
 Chet Is Back! (RCA 1962)

With Kenny Burrell
 Weaver of Dreams (Columbia, 1960–61)

With Donald Byrd
 Byrd in Paris (Brunswick, 1958)
 Parisian Thoroughfare (Brunswick, 1958)

With Milt Jackson
 Bags & Flutes (Atlantic, 1957)

With J. J. Johnson
 J Is for Jazz (Columbia, 1956)
 Dial J. J. 5 (Columbia, 1957)
 Really Livin' (Columbia, 1959)

With Hank Jones
 Hank Jones' Quartet (Savoy, 1956)

With Wynton Kelly
 Kelly Blue (Riverside, 1959)
With The Prestige All Stars

 Interplay for 2 Trumpets and 2 Tenors (Prestige, 1957)
With John Rae
 Opus de Jazz 2 (Savoy 1960)

References

External links

 Bobby Jaspar Discography
 
 Page on jazzinbelgium.com

1926 births
1963 deaths
Cool jazz saxophonists
Cool jazz flautists
Hard bop saxophonists
Hard bop flautists
Belgian jazz saxophonists
Belgian jazz flautists
Musicians from Liège
20th-century saxophonists
20th-century flautists